Charles Everett Fraser (August 9, 1891 – August 9, 1970) was a Canadian ice hockey defenceman who played in one National Hockey League game for the Hamilton Tigers during the 1923–24 NHL season. He played on December 22, 1923 against the Toronto St. Pats. The rest of his career was spent in amateur leagues in Nova Scotia, and he retired in 1925.

Career statistics

Regular season and playoffs

See also
List of players who played only one game in the NHL

References

External links

1891 births
1970 deaths
Canadian ice hockey defencemen
Hamilton Tigers (ice hockey) players
Ice hockey people from Nova Scotia
People from Pictou County